Ramakant Goswami (born 29 October 1944) was a member of the Legislative Assembly of Delhi from Rajendra Nagar constituency. He was the Minister of Industry, Labour, Election, Law & Justice and Parliament Affairs, Govt. of NCT, Delhi. He was also a member of the Business Advisory Committee of Delhi Government since 2002.

Early life
He was born to Dr Girdhari Lal Goswami and Dev Rani Goswami in British India. After the partition of India, he and his family migrated to India. He did his post-graduation in Hindi from Kurukshetra University and followed this with a diploma in journalism from Bharatiya Vidya Bhavan. He was an active journalist for thirty years and worked as lecturer at S.D. College in Ambala. He was an active sportsman during his college days.

Political career
He entered in active politics in 1998 for the Delhi State Assembly Elections and contested for Congress Party for the seat of MLA from Patel Nagar constituency, he won and repeated his success again in the year 2003. In the 2008 elections, he was nominated from Rajendra Nagar constituency. He won the seat from the Bhartiya Janata Party candidate Asha Yogi by 5000 votes.

Positions held
He has served on several major positions of many organisations and within Congress, some of them are:-
 General Secretary — Delhi Pradesh Congress Committee
 General Secretary — All India Sanatan Dharam Pratinidhi Sammelan
 General Secretary — All India Sanskrit Sahitya Sammelan
 Parliamentary Secretary to Chief Minister
 Chief Whip of Congress Legislative Party

See also
Legislative Assembly of Delhi
2008 Delhi state assembly elections

References

Members of the Delhi Legislative Assembly
People from Delhi
Living people
Indian National Congress politicians
1944 births
Kurukshetra University alumni
Politicians from Lahore
State cabinet ministers of Delhi
Delhi MLAs 2008–2013